Peca may refer to:
 
 Peca (mountain) – mountain in Karawank Mountains at the Slovenia–Austria border
 Michael Peca – Canadian professional ice hockey forward in the National Hockey League
 Peça – unit of value in the slave trade in West Africa through the Cape Verde Islands during the 16th to 18th centuries
 La Peca – name of a district and its main town in the Bagua Province, Amazonas Region of Peru